Danae Suzanna Sweetapple is an Australian Paralympic swimmer. She was born in the Queensland town of St George. Sweetapple attended boarding school at 11  and has a Bachelor of Arts in Literature.

She took up swimming in 1990. Her early swimming results led to her being offered one of the first Australian Institute of Sport scholarships for disabled swimmers. At the 1992 Barcelona Games, she won a silver medal in the Women's 100 m Freestyle B2 event and she won two bronze medals in the Women's 100 m Backstroke B2 and Women's 50 m Freestyle B2 events. After the Games she commented "I'd be so happy if more people could make movement and sport a way of life. It's a great way to meet people and gain confidence."

Sweetapple was the Young Queenslander of the Year in 1992.

References

Female Paralympic swimmers of Australia
Swimmers at the 1992 Summer Paralympics
Paralympic silver medalists for Australia
Paralympic bronze medalists for Australia
Australian Institute of Sport Paralympic swimmers
Sportswomen from Queensland
Living people
Medalists at the 1992 Summer Paralympics
Year of birth missing (living people)
Paralympic medalists in swimming
Australian female freestyle swimmers
Australian female backstroke swimmers